The 2019 West Florida Argonauts football team represented the University of West Florida as a member of the Gulf South Conference (GSC) during the 2019 NCAA Division II football season. They were led by fourth-year head coach Pete Shinnick. The Argonauts played their home games at Blue Wahoos Stadium. The Argonauts won the 2019 NCAA Division II Football Championship by defeating , 48–40 in the 2019 NCAA Division II Football Championship Game.

Preseason

Gulf South Conference coaches poll
On August 1, 2019, the Gulf South Conference released their preseason coaches poll with the Argonauts predicted to finish in 4th place in the conference.

Preseason All-Gulf South Conference Team
The Argonauts had three players at two positions selected to the preseason all-Gulf South Conference team.

Offense

Samuel Antoine – OT

Defense

Trent Archie – LB

Andre Duncombe Jr. – LB

Special teams

No players were selected

Schedule
West Florida 2019 football schedule consists of five home and five away games in the regular season. The Argonauts will host GSC foes Delta State, Mississippi College, North Greenville, and West Alabama, and will travel to Florida Tech, Shorter, Valdosta State, and West Georgia.

The Argonauts will host one of the two non-conference games against Virginia-Lynchburg and  will travel to Carson–Newman from the South Atlantic Conference (SAC).

Two of the ten games will be broadcast on ESPN3 and ESPN+, as part of the Gulf South Conference Game of the Week.

Rankings

References

West Florida
West Florida Argonauts football seasons
NCAA Division II Football Champions
West Florida Argonauts football